Dunajské trstiny is a nature reserve in the Slovak municipalities of Veľké Kosihy and Klížska Nemá in the Komárno District. The nature reserve covers an area of 104.1016 ha of the Danube floodplain area. It has a protection level of 4 under the Slovak nature protection system.

Description
The area protects continuous reed communities. It presents a possibility to study the final stage of the silting process, houses wetland and hydrophile plant species and presents nesting places for wetland and reed birds.

References

Geography of Nitra Region
Protected areas of Slovakia